Marcus Beneventanus was a medieval Italian publisher of maps and books.

Life 

He was originally a Celestine monk. He later took up a career in cartography and publishing.

Career 

He was a contemporary of Johannes Ruysch and Martin Waldseemuller.

Bibliography 

Notable maps printed by him include:
 Ptolemy map of Scandinavia

Notable books printed by him include:
 In hoc opere haec continentur Geographiae Cl. Ptolemaei emẽta : & cu archetypo graeco collata. Planisphaerium Cl. Ptolemaei noviter recognitum et emendatum a Marco Monacho
 Adversus novam marci beneventani astronomiam, quae positionem alphonsinam, de motu octavi orbis multis modis depravavit, apologia

References

External links 
 thesaurus.cerl.org
 worldcat.org

Italian publishers (people)
16th-century Italian cartographers